Sodium- and chloride-dependent glycine transporter 1, also known as glycine transporter 1, is a protein that in humans is encoded by the SLC6A9 gene.

Selective inhibitors
Elevation of extracellular synaptic glycine concentration by blockade of GlyT1 has been hypothesized to potentiate NMDA receptor function in vivo and to represent a rational approach for the treatment of schizophrenia and cognitive disorders. Several drug candidates have reached clinical trials.
 ASP2535
 Bitopertin (RG1678), which has entered phase II trials for the treatment of schizophrenia
 Iclepertin (BI 425809) by Boehringer Ingelheim which is thought to improve cognitive impairment due to schizophrenia
 Org 25935 (Sch 900435)
 PF-03463275 (in phase II trial)
 Pesampator (PF-04958242) by Pfizer
 Sarcosine which is thought to improve cognitive impairment due to schizophrenia

See also
 Sodium:neurotransmitter symporter
 Solute carrier family

References

Further reading

Solute carrier family